Leo Argyros was a Byzantine aristocrat and general active in the first decades of the 10th century.

Life 
He was the son of the magistros Eustathios Argyros, droungarios of the Watch under Leo VI the Wise (ruled 886–912). In ca. 910, Leo and his brother  Pothos Argyros were serving at court as manglabites (personal bodyguards of the emperor), when their father was poisoned after being suspected by Leo for plotting against him. The two brothers brought their father's body for burial to their ancestral monastery of Saint Elizabeth in the Charsianon district.

Pothos and Leo both followed military careers. According to Constantine VII Porphyrogennetos, already in 911, Leo, despite his youth, became military governor (strategos) of the theme of Sebasteia, with the rank of protospatharios. Both brothers played a distinguished role during the regency of Empress Zoe Karbonopsina (913–919). Leo and a younger brother, Romanos, participated in the campaign against Bulgaria that ended in the disastrous Battle of Achelous on 20 August 917.

Under Romanos I Lekapenos (r. 920–944), Leo reached the highest offices and attained the ranks of patrikios and eventually magistros. In April 922 he commanded, along with his brother Pothos, who was then Domestic of the Schools, the rhaiktor John, and the droungarios of the imperial fleet Alexios Mosele, the army that confronted a Bulgarian raid under the kavkhan Menikos, that had reached the outskirts of Constantinople. The subsequent Battle of Pegae was a rout for the Byzantines, but the two Argyroi managed to escape to safety in a nearby fort. At some point, Leo too served as Domestic of the Schools, but it is unclear when. Jean-François Vannier suggested the period between Pegae and June 922, when John Kourkouas held the post, but this seems too brief. Rodolphe Guilland also suggested a brief tenure sometime before 922, or perhaps after Romanos Lekapenos' fall in 944. On the other hand, it is also possible that Byzantine historians confused Leo with his brother Pothos.

Leo Argyros had two sons, Marianos Argyros and Romanos Argyros. Both were firm supporters of Romanos Lekapenos and  enjoyed high court titles; Romanos Argyros even married the emperor's daughter, Agathe. Through Romanos, Leo Argyros was probably the great-grandfather of Emperor Romanos III Argyros (r. 1028–1034).

References

Sources 
 
 
 
 

9th-century births
10th-century deaths
10th-century Byzantine people
Leo
Byzantine generals
Byzantine people of the Byzantine–Bulgarian Wars
Domestics of the Schools
Patricii
Manglabitai
Protospatharioi